Boris the Sprinkler is a punk rock band that formed in Green Bay, Wisconsin in 1992.

History
Boris the Sprinkler was founded in Green Bay in 1992 by Reverend Nørb (vocals) and Paul #1 (guitar). Nørb and Paul (born Paul Schroder) initially played with Eric Lee (bass) and Ronny Johnny Kispert (drums); later members included Eric James (bass), Ric 6 (bass), and Paul 2 (drums). Nørb, who was born Norb Rozek, had previously written for the music magazines Sick Teen and Maximum Rocknroll. Nørb's lyrics and the band's style were self-consciously irreverent, tongue-in-cheek, and referential to other aspects of pop culture, influenced by punk rock groups such as The Dickies, The Rezillos, and The Ramones. The group often dressed in flamboyant styles such as "zebra-print tights and gold lamé body suits".

Boris the Sprinkler released eight full-length albums over the period 1994-2000, including 1994's 8 Testicled Pogo Machine (which included a vocal cameo by Wesley Willis on its first track), 1998's End of the Century (which covered the Ramones album of the same name in its entirety), and two albums for Go-Kart Records, 1999's Suck and 2000's Gay. The group also released numerous EPs and singles, among them 1995's Mutant Pop release "Drugs and Masturbation" and 1996's "Kill the Ramones".

In 2013, Nørb published The Annotated Boris: Deconstructing the Lyrical Majesty of Boris the Sprinkler, a "line-by-line analysis" of songs he wrote for Boris the Sprinkler.

The band released a new album, Vespa to Venus, on Beer City Records on September 13, 2019. The release reunited the 1997 Mega Anal lineup of Paul #1, Paul #2, Ric Six, and Reverend Nørb.

Discography

Albums
8-Testicled Pogo Machine (Bulge Records, 1994)
Saucer to Saturn (Bulge Records, 1995)
End of the Century (Clearview Records, 1996)
Mega Anal (Bulge Records, 1997)
Suck (Go-Kart Records, 1999)
Group Sex (Bulge Records, 2000)
Gay (Go-Kart, 2000)
Vespa To Venus (Beer City, 2019)

Live albums
The Frozen Tundra of... Boris the Sprinkler (Bulge Records, 1998)
Live Cincinnati 1999 (Mutant Pop Records, 2000)

EPs
V.M.Live Presents Boris the Sprinkler 11/1/96 (VML Records)
Gratuitous 1998 Summer Tour 10" (Clearview Records)
Banana Pad Riot! / Split with The Vindictives, Young Fresh Fellows & Mr. T Experience (Skullduggery Records)
8" flexi-disc with Less Than Jake, Sonic Dolls and Mulligan Stu (Rhetoric Records)

Singles
4Money (split with Quencher) (Lombardi Records)
She's Got a Lighter / It's My Style (Trouser Cough Records)
(Do You Wanna) Grilled Cheese? / Bad Guy Reaction (Bulge Records)
Male Model / Superball Eyes / Ejector Seat (Bulge Records)
Beth / I Turned Into a Martian (split with The Droids) (Power Ground Records)
Drugs & Masturbation / Yeah Yeah / Yeah Yeah No (Mutant Pop Records)
Ready Steady Go (split w/ Scooby Don't) (Just Add Water Records)
True Grit / Poodle Party / Do the Mimi (split with the Meatmen) (Bulge Records)
Hey Ed! / Attitude (split w/ Moral Crux) (They Still Make Records)
Sheena's Got a Microwave / Chipmunks Are Go! / Chemistry Set (split with the Sonic Dolls) (Bulge Records)
113th Man / Son of Musical Interlude / Penalty Box / Can't Controllit (SuperSonicRefrigeRecords)
Kill the Ramones / Kill the Sex Pistols (Junk Records)
Little Yellow Box / Why Don't We Do It in the Dumpster / Get Off the Phone (Bulge Records)
New Wave Records / Yellow Pills / Hi, We're the Replacements (Mutant Pop Records)
Nikki The Sprinkler / Borisites (split with the Parasites) (Just Add Water Records)
(I've Been Hittin' On A) Russian Robot / Do The Go / Got The Time (Lookout Records)
Sick Sick Sick / Ultimatum / Busy Signals (split with the Dead Vampires) (Dirtnap Records)

Members
Rev. Nørb – vocals, keytar, guitar, harmonica
Paul No. 1 – guitar, vocals
Erik No. 1 – bass, guitar
Ronny Johnny Kispert – drums
Eric No. 2 – bass, vocals, recording engineer
Paul No. 2 – drums
Ric Six – bass
Tim 00 – bass
LP – guitar

Footnotes

Further reading
 Rev. Nørb [Norb Rozek], The Annotated Boris: Deconstructing the Lyrical Majesty of Boris the Sprinkler (and Other Tales as the Need Arises). n.c. [Green Bay, WI]: Bulge Records, 2012.

External links
 

Punk rock groups from Wisconsin
Musical groups established in 1992